Arctesthes avatar, commonly known as the avatar moth or the Denniston triangle moth, is a moth of the family Geometridae and is endemic to New Zealand. It has been found in short-lived wetlands at elevations between 640 and 1000 metres, but only in the areas of the Denniston Plateau and the nearby Mount Rochfort in the Buller District of the West Coast Region of the South Island. The species was discovered by Brian Patrick in 2012, during a bio-blitz on the Denniston Plateau organised by Forest & Bird as part of a campaign against the planned development of an open-cast coal mine by Bathurst Resources. The name of the new species was proposed in 2012, following a competition run by Forest & Bird and judged by Patrick and his son. It was first described by Brian H. Patrick, Hamish J. H. Patrick and Robert J. B. Hoare in 2019. A. avatar has Nationally Critical conservation status under the New Zealand Threat Classification System.

Discovery 
A new species of day-flying moth was discovered by Brian Patrick and his son in March 2012, during a bio-blitz on the Denniston Plateau organised by Forest & Bird, who were campaigning against the planned development of an open-cast coal mine by Bathurst Resources. Patrick made two more visits to the area in subsequent years, and netted another 10 individuals. This allowed work to begin on the formal description of the new species.

Taxonomy and nomenclature 
This species was first described in 2019 by Brian H. Patrick, Hamish J. H. Patrick and Robert J. B. Hoare and named Arctesthes avatar. Prior to its scientific description this species was known as Arctesthes sp. “Denniston”. A. avatar was named in honour of the 2009 movie Avatar, after Forest & Bird ran a competition in 2012 encouraging the public to submit suggested names to raise awareness about a proposed coal mine at the locality where this species is found.. Brian and Hamish Patrick judged the submissions, and chose "avatar" as the epithet for this species, as the Avatar movie plot concerned a mining company and its actions threatening a fictional ecosystem. The male holotype specimen, collected at Denniston Plateau, is held in the New Zealand Arthropod Collection.

Description 

The larvae have been described as being brown on the upper side and a paler shade on the underside of the caterpillar.

The adult male of this species was described as follows:

The female of the species is similar in appearance to the male but is paler and does not have pectinations on the antennae.

Habitat and hosts 

This species inhabits short-lived wetlands on the Denniston Plateau and Mount Rochfort in the West Coast at altitudes of between 640 and 1000 m. Larvae of sister species in this genus feed on various species of native herbaceous plants. It has been hypothesised that the sole host of the larvae of this species is Liparophyllum gunnii, as females have been observed laying eggs on the underside of the leaves of this plant. An attempt was made to rear this species in captivity, with the larvae being feed on wilting leaves, stems and roots of this plant, but this was unsuccessful.

Behaviour 
This species is a day flying moth. Adults have been observed on the wing in February and March.

Conservation status
A. avatar has the "Nationally Critical" conservation status under the New Zealand Threat Classification System. It was given this classification as its total area of occupancy is smaller than 1 ha, in just one location. Since this classification this moth has also been located at Mount Rochfort, near the type locality of the species, but it is still regarded as being extremely localised.

References

External links 

 Artesthes avatar discussed on RNZ Critter of the Week, 8 July 2022

Moths of New Zealand
Larentiinae
Moths described in 2019
Endemic fauna of New Zealand
Endangered biota of New Zealand
Endemic moths of New Zealand